Greg Bloedorn (born November 15, 1972) was an American football offensive lineman for the Seattle Seahawks of the National Football League. He was signed by the Seahawks in 1996. Bloedorn played college football at Cornell University. His professional career spanned three active roster seasons with the Seattle Seahawks:  to  until he was released in 2000.

High school football
Bloedorn was born in Elmhurst, Illinois. He attended high school at Glenbard South in Glen Ellyn, Illinois. Bloedorn played football and basketball in high school. He graduated in 1991.

College football
Bloedorn played college football at Cornell University from 1991 to 1995. His first year he played tight end and was named the team's Most Improved Player. He was injured his third year and only played two games. Bloedorn's Cornell biography states that in his senior year he "received Football News All-Ivy first-team honors, and was All-Ivy first-team as voted by the coaches. He was a two-time recipient of the Sid Roth Most Valuable Down Lineman Award. A tri-captain as a senior, he earned National Football Gazette All-America second-team honors"

Professional football
Bloedorn was signed as a free agent by the Seattle Seahawks in 1996. His first season was spent on the practice squad. In the 1997 season he played in three games as a center and long snapper. The following year, he participated in NFL Europe with the England Monarchs. Bloedorn's final season was with the Seahawks.

Career statistics

References

1972 births
Living people
American football offensive guards
Cornell Big Red football players
London Monarchs players
Seattle Seahawks players
People from Elmhurst, Illinois
Players of American football from Illinois